The term Derby Gaol historically refers to the five gaols in Derby, England.  Today, the term usually refers to one of two small ‘tourist attractions’, the gaol which stood on Friar Gate from 1756 to 1846 and the cells of which still exist and are open to the public.   Their possible location, size and function have been assigned for the attraction, along side a modern kitchen and bar.   The 1843 to 1929 Vernon Street Prison whose frontage can still be seen today, but has been the prison has been redeveloped for modern commercial use.

History
In 1652 the Cornmarket Gaol (no longer extant) was the site of the imprisonment of George Fox on charges of blasphemy.  Fox became the founder of the Christian denomination the Religious Society of Friends, perhaps better known as the Quakers.  It has been alleged that Judge Bennett of Derby first used the term Quaker to describe the movement, as they bid him to 'quake for fear of the Lord', but the phrase had already been used in the context of other religious groups so the etymology is dubious.

The last person to be hanged at Derby Gaol was William Slack on 16 July 1907 for the murder of Lucy Wilson.

Friar Gate Gaol
The Friar Gate Gaol was site of many hangings, and the small attraction today displays reproduction newspaper accounts of the executions on the walls, a replica of a gallows which stood in front of the building can be located in the small garden of the gaol.   The police museum has subsequently closed.

The New County Gaol (Vernon Street Prison)
The Vernon Street Prison served as the County Gaol from 1843 to 1919, at which time it was demolished.  The last public execution at Derby of Richard Thorley for the murder of Eliza Morrow took place here in 1862.  From 1919 to 1929 the prison acted as a military prison.  Following demolition, the site served as a Derby Greyhound Stadium, and today contains prestige offices, though the historical facade still remains.

Notable prisoners
Jeremiah Brandreth - High Treason
Humphrey Berisford - Recusant

References

External links
History of Derby County Gaol from theprison.org.uk 
Derby Gaol website

Museums in Derby
Prisons in Derbyshire
Prison museums in the United Kingdom
Defunct prisons in England